Boris Leonidovich Romanov (born March 29, 1942, Lyubim, Yaroslavl Oblast) is a Soviet and Russian film and theater actor, People's Artist of Russia (2005).

Biography 
Boris Romanov born March 29, 1942 in Lyubim (Yaroslavl Oblast).

In 1959-1961 he studied at drama school at Saratov Drama Theater, there at the age of 17, he went to the professional scene. Then he entered the   studio Moscow Art Theatre (Sofya Pilyavskaya and Alexander Karev course) and he graduated in 1966. In 1966–1982 years - an actor  the Moscow Stanislavsky Drama Theater, in 1982–1985 years - in Taganka Theatre. Since 1990 -  Hermitage  Moscow theater.

Selected filmography
 1964 –  I, Beryoza as a German officer
 1969  –  Bonivur's Heart as episode
 1970 –  Sport, Sport, Sport as merchant Kalashnikov
 1973 –  The Silence of Dr. Evans as Buami
 1974 – Agony as Balashov
 1979 – The Wild Hunt King Stach as coroner
 1984 – Planet Parade as organic chemist
 1989 – Crash – Cop's Daughter as Andrey Olegovich
 1989 – Entrance to the Labyrinth as Vladimir Lyzhin
  1991  – Humiliated and Insulted as Nikolay Ikhmenev
 2006 – The First Circle as professor Chelnov

References

External links

1942 births
Russian male film actors
Soviet male film actors
People from Yaroslavl Oblast
Russian male stage actors
Soviet male stage actors
Living people
People's Artists of Russia
Honored Artists of the Russian Federation
Moscow Art Theatre School alumni